Mortimer's Law is a British television crime drama series, first broadcast on 6 February 1998, that ran for six episodes on BBC One. The series starred Amanda Root as Rachel Mortimer, a London-based barrister who finds herself relocating to rural Wales after her defence in a sexual assault case goes horrifically wrong. Taking up the post of Coroner, Mortimer finds herself investigating a series of gruesome cases alongside her loyal partner, Gwil Humpries (Nicholas McGaughey). Initially broadcast at 21:30 on Fridays, a single series was broadcast before being axed by the network. The series was a co-production between Chatsworth television and BBC Wales.

Root said of her role in the series; "When researching the role, I listened to some tapes from a Coroner's Officer where they were trying to establish if someone who had died under the wheels of a train had committed suicide. There was an interview with the train driver, who had to give all the facts about what he saw in the last moments before the train hit this man - how he had run on to the line, how he had braced himself. I will never forget those images. I also went to see a woman coroner in Southwark who was fantastic. She was very centred and self-controlled. She organised her court quite brilliantly, and she was formidable in the best sense of the word."

Cast
 Amanda Root as Coroner Rachel Mortimer
 Nicholas McGaughey as DC Gwil Humphries
 Gwenyth Petty as Mrs. Morgan
 Shirley King as Sioned 
 Clive Merrison as Tegwyh 
 Louise Breckon-Richards as Angela
 Valentine Pelka as John Keswick
 Robert Blythe as Bernard
 Gillian Elisa as Jane Harris
 Helen Griffin as Mrs. Watkins
 Margaret John as Megan Jeffries
 Ieuan Rhys as Sergeant Price
 Dorien Thomas as Batty

Episodes

References

External links

1998 British television series debuts
1998 British television series endings
1990s British crime television series
1990s British drama television series
BBC television dramas
1990s British television miniseries
English-language television shows
Television shows set in Wales